This is a timeline of the history of the British television company ABC Weekend TV, one of the first four contractors of the Independent Television network.

1950s

 1954
 26 October – The Independent Television Authority (ITA) awards franchises for weekend services in the Midlands and North of England regions to Kemsley-Winnick Television.
 1955
 21 September – After the collapse of Kemsley-Winnick, the ITA approaches Associated British Picture Corporation (ABPC) to provide the services instead, and the contract is signed today.
 8 October – After legal action from ABPC, the weekend service for London is renamed from ABC (Associated Broadcasting Company) to ATV (Associated TeleVision), thus allowing ABPC to later use the ABC name for its own TV service.
 1956
 17 February – Alpha Television, a joint venture between ABC and the Midlands weekday contractor ATV, re-opens the former Astoria Cinema in Aston, Birmingham, as a studio shared between ABC and ATV.
 18 February – ABPC's new company, Associated British Cinemas (Television) Ltd, begins its Midlands weekend service, under the brand name "ABC", broadcasting from Lichfield transmitting station. Its logo is based on the logo of ABC Cinemas (owned by ABPC).
 5 May – ABC begins its North of England weekend service. Initially the service covers the North West from Winter Hill transmitting station. The former Capitol Cinema in Didsbury, Manchester, re-opens as ABC's studios in the North of England.
 3 November – ABC's North of England service is extended to Yorkshire via Emley Moor transmitting station.
 1958
 November – ABC buys the former Warner film studios at Teddington Lock in London, to be converted into television studios.
 1959
 Teddington Studios open as ABC's main production centre in London.
 September – ABC introduces a new logo based on inverted triangles, accompanied by a jingle based on the musical notes A, B and C.

1960s
 1961
 7 January – The first episode of ABC's cult TV series The Avengers is broadcast. The series will run until 1969. 
 18 July – A new  mast at Lichfield replaces the existing  mast to extend ABC's Midland service.
 August – Alpha Television in Birmingham upgrades its site to provide a second studio, office block, canteen and other facilities.
 1964
 11 July – ABC transmits the first episode of its version of the talent show Opportunity Knocks. A previous version had been made for one series in 1956 by Associated-Rediffusion. ABC and its successor Thames Television continue to produce the show until 1978.
 1965
 2 January – World of Sport is first broadcast. ABC compiles and hosts the show from contributions from the whole ITV network. After ABC's demise, the show would be hosted by London Weekend (branded as ITV Sport) until 1985.
 30 April – Membury transmitting station extends ABC's Midland service to the Thames Valley area.
 11 June – A new relay station in Scarborough extends ABC's North of England service.
 1966
  28 February – A new  mast at Winter Hill replaces the existing  mast to extend ABC's service in the North West.
  15 August – A new  mast at Emley Moor replaces the existing  mast to extend ABC's service in Yorkshire.
 1967
 13 January – The fifth series of The Avengers begins in the UK. This is the first series shot on colour film, even though ITV could not broadcast in colour until nearly three years later; the colour is for the benefit of US audiences. ABC uses the name "Associated British Corporation" at the end of Avengers episodes in this series, to avoid confusion with the US ABC network.
 11 June – At its franchise review, the ITA decides that ABC will lose both its licences in 1968. Subsequently the owners of ABC and the London weekday contractor Rediffusion will jointly form a new company Thames Television which will be awarded the new London weekday franchise.
 1968
 28 July – ABC broadcasts for the last time. Its Midlands service is to be replaced by ATV, and its North of England service is to be replaced by Granada Television in the North West and Yorkshire Television in Yorkshire.
 30 July – Thames Television comes on air. The ABC brand continues to be used on some filmed programmes broadcast by Thames (including the final series of The Avengers). Thames inherits ABC's Teddington Studios.

See also
 Timeline of ITV
 Timeline of Thames Television – ABC's production successor
 Timeline of Granada Television – ABC's broadcast successor in the North West
 Timeline of Yorkshire Television – ABC's broadcast successor in Yorkshire
 Timeline of ATV – ABC's broadcast successor in the Midlands

References

Television in the United Kingdom by year
ITV timelines